Good Times, Bed Times (戀上你的床, Luen seung ngei dik chong) is a 2003 Hong Kong romantic comedy film starring Sammi Cheng, Louis Koo, Sean Lau, Charlene Choi, with guest appearances by Tony Leung and Sandra Ng.

Cast
Sammi Cheng as Carrie Wat
Louis Koo as Inspector Paul Ko Chi-keung
Sean Lau as Magistrate Raymond
Charlene Choi as Tabby
Tony Leung Ka-fai as Boss Ike Hung
Sandra Ng as BoBo Au
Jim Chim as Uncle Lam
Tats Lau as Tabby's father
Lee Lik-chi as Paul's superior
Lam Suet as Judge Chow
Pinky Cheung as P
Raymond Wong Yuk-man as Magazine chief
Philip Chan as Superintendent
Chui Tien-you as Basketball interviewee
Wong You-nam as Basketball interviewee
Maggie Lau as Policewoman in TV commercial
Zhuge Boli as Japanese AV muscle man
Niki Chow as Peggy
Helen Ma as Female PTU
Gloria Chan as Female CID
Angela Au as Female SDU
Elaine Ho as Female traffic police
Serena Po as Policewoman
Six Luk as Tuition teacher
Yeung Wong-fook as Yakuza's representative
Leung Kin-chuen as Shooter
Poon Hang-sang as District Judge
Vincent Chik as SDU

Reception
Comparing the film to La Brassiere, an earlier creative collaboration by the creative team Hing-Ka Chan, Patrick Leung, and Amy Chin, Variety wrote that Good Times, Bed Times was "less vaudevillian in its humor, but with a stronger pair of distaff thesps this time round", as "the joke comes from casting matinee idol Koo as a sexual non-achiever and Lau, not a prototype romantic lead, as an incurable lothario".

Variety reported that the film "grossed a sturdy HK$20 million ($2.5 million)" from its summer 2003 Hong Kong theatrical release.

The film was initially banned in Malaysia, then reworked and released there under the title In Love With You.

References

External links
 
 Good Times, Bed Times at Rotten Tomatoes
 HK Cinemagic entry

2003 films
2003 romantic comedy films
Hong Kong romantic comedy films
2000s Cantonese-language films
China Star Entertainment Group films
Films set in Hong Kong
Films shot in Hong Kong
2000s Hong Kong films